A Collection of Sacred Hymns, for the Church of the Latter Day Saints. was the first hymnal of the Latter Day Saint movement. It was published in 1835 by the Church of the Latter Day Saints.

Emma Smith selected 90 hymn texts for the hymnal. Many of these texts were revised or corrected by W. W. Phelps to fit with the theology of the early Latter Day Saint church.

The title page states 1835 as the publication date, but because of the printing of the Doctrine and Covenants the same year, printing of the hymnal was not completed until February 1836.

See also
Adam-ondi-Ahman (hymn): Early reference to Adam-ondi-Ahman
Joy to the World (Phelps): W. W. Phelps' adaptation of the popular Christmas carol
The Spirit of God Like a Fire Is Burning: Arguably the most popular Latter Day Saint hymn, which was included as a last-minute addition to the hymnal

References

External links
Collection of Sacred Hymns, 1835 - from The Joseph Smith Papers project Scanned images and transcription of each page
Hymnal - from Archive.org

History of the Latter Day Saint movement
Latter Day Saint hymnals
1835 books
Latter Day Saint movement in Ohio
1835 in Christianity
1835 in music
Church of Christ (Latter Day Saints)
Kirtland, Ohio